Yorkino is a rural locality (a village) in Kushkopalskoye Rural Settlement of Pinezhsky District, Arkhangelsk Oblast, Russia. The population was 257 as of 2010. There are 4 streets.

Geography 
Yorkino is located on the Pinega River, 24 km southeast of Karpogory (the district's administrative centre) by road. Shardonem is the nearest rural locality.

References 

Rural localities in Pinezhsky District